May Upton (20 December 1791 – 1870) was an English first-class cricketer active 1824 to 1835 who played for Sussex. He played mostly for local clubs in West Sussex and represented the county in one first-class match, against Godalming, in 1824.

References

Bibliography
 

1791 births
1870 deaths
English cricketers
English cricketers of 1787 to 1825
Sussex cricketers